Dewaar (Urdu: دیوار,  literal English translation: "wall") is the seventh studio album and the thirteenth overall album of the Pakistani band, Junoon released in 2003. This was the last studio album released by the band after which both vocalist, Ali Azmat and bassist, Brian O'Connell, left the band.

The single "Garaj Baras", from the album, was selected as part of a Bollywood movie soundtrack in 2003 for the film "Paap" directed by Pooja Bhatt. The song topped the charts again in the country in 2004 and their controversial single "Pappu Yaar" shot to the #1 spot in Pakistan.

Track listing
All music written & composed by Junoon and Sabir Zafar.

Personnel
All information is taken from the CD.

Junoon
 Ali Azmat – vocals 
 Salman Ahmad – lead guitar, backing vocals
Brian O'Connell – bass guitar, backing vocals

Additional musicians
Drums played by Jay Dittamo & Allan Smith
Tablas by Ashiq Ali Mir
Dholak by Muhammad Azam
Vocals on "Ghoom Taana" by Ali Noor

Production
Produced by John Alec & Salman Ahmad
Recorded & Mixed at Emad Studios & Grandview Studios
Engineered & Mixed by John Alec and Shehzad Hasan

External links
 Junoon's Official Website

2004 albums
Junoon (band) albums
Urdu-language albums